Ločki Vrh is a small settlement in the hills north of Destrnik in northeastern Slovenia. The area is part of the traditional region of Styria. The entire Municipality of Destrnik is now included in the Drava Statistical Region.

A small chapel-shrine in the settlement dates to 1875.

References

External links
Ločki Vrh on Geopedia

Populated places in the Municipality of Destrnik